Toto Tours Italy is a 1948 Italian comedy film directed by Mario Mattoli and starring Totò. The film features cameos of famous cyclists and other sportsmen of the time: Fausto Coppi, Gino Bartali, Fiorenzo Magni, Ferdi Kubler, Giordano Cottur, Gianni Ortelli, Oreste Conte, Adolfo Consolini, Louison Bobet, Briek Schotte, Amos Matteucci, Jean-Pierre Wimille, Ulisse Lorenzetti, Di Segni, Amadeo Deiana, Aldo Spoldi, Giuseppe Tosi, Camillo Achilli and Tazio Nuvolari.

Plot

Totò Casamandrei, a middle-aged high school professor, sells his soul to the Devil to win the Giro d'Italia and impress the young Doriana, a cycling fan.

Cast
 Totò as Prof. Toto' Casamandrei
 Isa Barzizza as Doriana
 Giuditta Rissone as Signora Casamandrei
 Walter Chiari as Bruno
 Carlo Ninchi as Dante Alighieri
 Luigi Catoni as Nerone
 Mario Castellani as Renato Stella, allenatore
 Carlo Micheluzzi as Il Diavolo
 Fulvia Franco as Miss Italia
 Alda Mangini as Gervasia
 Ughetto Bertucci as Armando
Gino Bartali as himself
Fausto Coppi as himself

References

Bibliography
 Brunetta, Gian Piero. The History of Italian Cinema: A Guide to Italian Film from Its Origins to the Twenty-first Century.  Princeton University Press, 2009.

External links

1948 films
1948 comedy films
Italian comedy films
Films set in Italy
Films scored by Nino Rota
1940s Italian-language films
Italian black-and-white films
Cycling films
Films directed by Mario Mattoli
1940s Italian films